Heart Over Mind is the nineteenth studio album by Canadian country pop artist Anne Murray. It was released by Capitol Records in the fall of 1984. The album peaked at number 4 on the Billboard Top Country Albums chart and was certified Gold by the RIAA.

The disc's first 45, "Nobody Loves Me Like You Do", a duet with Dave Loggins, hit #1 on the U.S. Country singles chart and went Top 10 on Billboard's Adult Contemporary chart.  The follow-up single, "Time Don't Run Out on Me", reached #2 Country and #11 A/C.  Both singles topped the Canadian Country singles chart.

Track listing

Personnel
 Anne Murray – lead vocals 
 Dennis Burnside – acoustic piano (1, 2, 9, 10)
 David Innis – synthesizers (1-5, 8, 9, 10)
 Keith Thomas – synthesizers (2, 8)
 John Barlow Jarvis – electric piano (3)
 Doug Riley – acoustic piano (3, 6), electric piano (4, 5, 7, 8)
 Jack Lenz – synthesizers (4, 5, 8), electric piano (6), acoustic piano (7)
 Michael Boddicker – synthesizers (5)
 Steve Gibson – electric guitar (1, 2, 3, 9, 10)
 Paul Worley – acoustic guitar (1, 2, 9, 10)
 Mike "Pepe" Francis – acoustic guitar (3), electric guitar (4-8)
 John Hug – electric guitar (4, 8)
 Bob Mann – electric guitar (4, 5, 7, 8), acoustic guitar (6)
 Sonny Garrish – steel guitar (7, 10)
 Tom Robb – bass (1)
 Michael Rhodes – bass (2, 9, 10)
 Tom Szczesniak – bass (3-8)
 James Stroud – drums (1)
 Eddie Bayers – drums (2, 9, 10)
 Barry Keane – drums (3-8)
 Mark Harris – percussion (2)
 Bryan Cumming – saxophone (1)
 Bergen White – string arrangements and conductor 
 Carl Gorodetzky – concertmaster 
 The Nashville String Machine – strings
 Thom Flora – backing vocals (1, 4, 8)
 Bill Lamb – backing vocals (1, 4, 8)
 Gary Pigg – backing vocals (1, 4, 8)
 Randy Sharp – backing vocals (1)
 Tom Kelly – backing vocals (2, 5)
 Richard Page – backing vocals (2, 5, 9) 
 Dave Loggins – lead vocals (6), backing vocals (9)

Production
 Jim Ed Norman – producer 
 Balmur Ltd. – executive producer 
 Ken Friesen – recording 
 Terry Christian – additional recording 
 Scott Hendricks – additional recording 
 Eric Prestidge – additional recording, mixing, mastering 
 Rick Caughron – recording assistant 
 Lee Groitzsch – recording assistant
 Tom Henderson – recording assistant 
 Alan Henry – recording assistant 
 Glenn Meadows – mastering 
 Paige Rowden – production manager 
 Paul Cade – art direction, design 
 Bill King – photography 

Studios
 Recorded at Eastern Sound (Toronto, Ontario, Canada); Sound Stage Studios (Nashville, Tennessee, USA); Sunset Sound (Hollywood, California, USA).
 Mixed at Sound Stage Studios
 Mastered at Masterfonics (Nashville, Tennessee, USA).

Charts

Weekly charts

Year-end charts

References

1984 albums
Anne Murray albums
Capitol Records albums
Albums produced by Jim Ed Norman